Abas Ismaili (born 21 March 1967) is an Iranian former cyclist. He competed in the team time trial at the 1988 Summer Olympics.

References

1967 births
Living people
Iranian male cyclists
Olympic cyclists of Iran
Cyclists at the 1988 Summer Olympics
Place of birth missing (living people)
20th-century Iranian people